The 1989 Alabama Crimson Tide football team (variously "Alabama", "UA", "Bama" or "The Tide") represented the University of Alabama in the 1989 NCAA Division I-A football season. It was the Crimson Tide's 97th overall and 56th season as a member of the Southeastern Conference (SEC). The team was led by head coach Bill Curry, in his third year, and played their home games at both Bryant–Denny Stadium in Tuscaloosa and Legion Field in Birmingham, Alabama. They finished the season with a record of ten wins and two losses (10–2 overall, 6–1 in the SEC), as SEC co-champions and with a loss in the Sugar Bowl against national championship winner Miami.

Alabama won its first ten games en route to its best record since 1980 and first SEC championship since 1981 season, its 19th overall. Highlights of the season included a 62–27 victory over Ole Miss after falling behind 21–0, a 47–30 victory over Tennessee in a match of unbeatens, and a 17–16 victory over Penn State in which Alabama blocked an 18-yard field goal try with 13 seconds left in the game for the win. The 32–16 win at LSU featured a first for the Crimson Tide, as Alabama safety Lee Ozmint scored the first ever defensive two-point conversion in school history on a 100-yard interception return of an LSU two-point conversion attempt.

However, in the season finale against Auburn—the first Iron Bowl ever played in Auburn, Alabama—the Tigers beat Alabama 30–20. As a result, Alabama, Auburn and Tennessee finished in a three-way tie for the conference championship. Alabama would however receive the conference's Sugar Bowl berth.

In the Sugar Bowl Miami would defeat Alabama 33–25 and be named national champions.

In the week after the Sugar Bowl loss, on January 7, 1990, Bill Curry resigned his position to take the head coaching job at Kentucky.

Schedule

Source: Rolltide.com: 1989 Alabama football schedule

Roster

Rankings

Game summaries

Tennessee

vs. Miami (FL) (Sugar Bowl)

References
General

 

Specific

Alabama
Alabama Crimson Tide football seasons
Southeastern Conference football champion seasons
Alabama Crimson Tide football